Heydarabad (also Romanized as Ḩeydarābād and Haidarābād; also known as Heydarābād-e Vasaţ) is a village in Karimabad Rural District, Sharifabad District, Pakdasht County, Tehran Province, Iran. At the 2006 census, its population was 322, in 71 families.

References 

Populated places in Pakdasht County